The United States National Library of Medicine (NLM), operated by the United States federal government, is the world's largest medical library.

Located in Bethesda, Maryland, the NLM is an institute within the National Institutes of Health. Its collections include more than seven million books, journals, technical reports, manuscripts, microfilms, photographs, and images on medicine and related sciences, including some of the world's oldest and rarest works.

The current director of the NLM is Patricia Flatley Brennan.

History 

The precursor of the National Library of Medicine, established in 1836, was the Library of the Surgeon General's Office, a part of the office of the Surgeon General of the United States Army. The Armed Forces Institute of Pathology and its Medical Museum were founded in 1862 as the Army Medical Museum. Throughout their history the Library of the Surgeon General's Office and the Army Medical Museum often shared quarters. From 1866 to 1887, they were housed in Ford's Theatre after production there was stopped, following the assassination of President Abraham Lincoln.

In 1956, the library collection was transferred from the control of the U.S. Department of Defense to the Public Health Service of the Department of Health, Education, and Welfare and renamed the National Library of Medicine, through the instrumentality of Frank Bradway Rogers, who was the director from 1956 to 1963. The library moved to its current quarters in Bethesda, Maryland, on the campus of the National Institutes of Health, in 1962.

Directors
Directors from 1945 - present

Publications and informational resources
Since 1879, the National Library of Medicine has published the Index Medicus, a monthly guide to articles, in nearly five thousand selected journals. The last issue of Index Medicus was printed in December 2004, but this information is offered in the freely accessible PubMed, among the more than fifteen million MEDLINE journal article references and abstracts going back to the 1960s and 1.5 million references going back to the 1950s.

The National Library of Medicine runs the National Center for Biotechnology Information, which houses biological databases (PubMed among them) that are freely accessible on the Internet through the Entrez search engine  and Lister Hill National Center For Biomedical Communications. As the United States National Release Center for SNOMED CT, NLM provides SNOMED CT data and resources to licensees of the NLM UMLS Metathesaurus. NLM maintains ClinicalTrials.gov registry for human interventional and observational studies. Additionally NLM runs ChemIDplus which is a chemical database of over 400,000 chemicals complete with names, synonyms, and structures. It includes links to NLM and other databases and resources, including links to federal, state and international agencies.

Toxicology and environmental health 
The Toxicology and Environmental Health Program was established at the National Library of Medicine in 1967 and is charged with developing computer databases compiled from the medical literature and from the files of governmental and nongovernmental organizations. The program has implemented several information systems for chemical emergency response and public education, such as the Toxicology Data Network, TOXMAP, Tox Town, Wireless Information System for Emergency Responders, Toxmystery, and the Household Products Database. These resources are accessible without charge on the internet.

Radiation exposure
The United States National Library of Medicine Radiation Emergency Management System provides: 
 Guidance for health care providers, primarily physicians, about clinical diagnosis and treatment of radiation injury during radiological and nuclear emergencies
 Just-in-time, evidence-based, usable information with sufficient background and context to make complex issues understandable to those without formal radiation medicine expertise
 Web-based information that may be downloaded in advance, so that it would be available during an emergency if the Internet were not accessible

Radiation Emergency Management System is produced by the United States Department of Health and Human Services, Office of the Assistant Secretary for Preparedness and Response, Office of Planning and Emergency Operations, in cooperation with the National Library of Medicine, Division of Specialized Information Services, with subject matter experts from the National Cancer Institute, the Centers for Disease Control and Prevention, and many U.S. and international consultants.

Extramural division
The Extramural Division provides grants to support research in medical information science and to support planning and development of computer and communications systems in medical institutions. Research, publications, and exhibitions on the history of medicine and the life sciences also are supported by the History of Medicine Division. In April 2008 the current exhibition Against the Odds: Making a Difference in Global Health was launched.

National Center for Biotechnology Information division 
National Center for Biotechnology Information is an intramural division within National Library of Medicine that creates public databases in molecular biology, conducts research in computational biology, develops software tools for analyzing molecular and genomic data, and disseminates biomedical information, all for the better understanding of processes affecting human health and disease.

See also
 JournalReview.org
 National Library of Medicine classification system
 PubMed

References

Further reading

External links 

 
 A Brief History of NLM
 Clinical Trials, research information 
 HIV Info, treatment and clinical trial information
 History of Medicine Division: Finding Aids, a  discovery service

 
Medical libraries
Medicine
Library of Medicine
Libraries in Maryland
Bibliographic database providers
Buildings and structures in Bethesda, Maryland
National Library of Medicine
Libraries established in 1836
1830s establishments in Washington, D.C.
1836 establishments in the United States
Library buildings completed in 1962
1962 establishments in Maryland
Research libraries in the United States
Chemical databases